William A. "Bill" Bronrott (born 1955) served in the Maryland House of Delegates from January 13, 1999, until April 26, 2010, representing Maryland's District 16 in Montgomery County. He stepped down from his seat in the General Assembly to accept a presidential appointment as Deputy Administrator of the Federal Motor Carrier Safety Administration at the U.S. Department of Transportation.

Bronrott was born in Washington, DC on June 30, 1955. He graduated from Montgomery Blair High School in Silver Spring before earning a Bachelor of Arts degree in communications and a Master of Arts degree in political communication from the University of Maryland, College Park. He worked on Capitol Hill as press secretary for Congressman Michael D. Barnes from 1979 to 1987 before founding his own firm, Bronrott Communications.

References

Democratic Party members of the Maryland House of Delegates
Living people
University of Maryland, College Park alumni
1955 births
21st-century American politicians